The Folk Heritage Museum or Phelchey Toenkhyim is a museum in Thimphu, Thimphu District, Bhutan.

History
The museum was opened on 28 July 2001 from the initiative of founder queen mother Ashi Dorji Wangmo Wangchuck.

Architecture
The museum is housed in a 3-story 19th century traditional rammed mud and timber house aged more than 150 years. It includes paddy, wheat and millet fields, watermill, kitchen gardens, hot stone bath etc. The ground floor resembles barn, the upper floor resembles safe store and the top most floor resembles living and dining area.

Exhibitions
The museums displays various materials related to the Bhutanese culture and way of life. Exhibitions includes rural households artifacts, equipment, objects and tools. It regularly holds events for education and culture demonstrations. It regularly holds buffet lunch and dinner.

See also
 List of museums in Bhutan

References

External links
 

2001 establishments in Bhutan
Buildings and structures in Thimphu
Museums in Bhutan
Museums established in 2001